Giorgio Tombesi (22 March 1926 – 3 January 2023) was an Italian politician. A member of the Christian Democracy party, he served in the Chamber of Deputies from 1976 to 1983.

Tombesi died in Trieste on 3 January 2023, at the age of 96.

References

1926 births
2023 deaths
Christian Democracy (Italy) politicians
Deputies of Legislature VII of Italy
Deputies of Legislature VIII of Italy
People from Udine